This is a list of firearm cartridges which have bullets in the  to  caliber range.

Length refers to the cartridge case length.
OAL refers to the overall length of the cartridge.

All measurements are in mm (in).

Pistol cartridges

Revolver cartridges

Rifle cartridges

See also
.410 bore

References

Pistol and rifle cartridges